The following is an incomplete list of the songs known to have been recorded and/or performed by Suman Kalyanpur in Hindi languages. Majority of these songs have featured in Hindi movies. Many of her old songs have featured in various new films (Hollywood or Indian films) & have also been credited. But such songs, unless re-recorded, are not enlisted below.

Songs

References

External links 

Kalyanpur, Suman